Neocollyris emarginata is a species of ground beetle in the genus Neocollyris in the family Carabidae. It was described by Dejean in 1825.

References

Emarginata, Neocollyris
Beetles described in 1825